The ashy-bellied Oldfield mouse (Thomasomys cinereiventer) is a species of rodent in the family Cricetidae.
It is found in Colombia and Ecuador.

References

 Baillie, J. 1996.  Thomasomys cinereiventer.   2006 IUCN Red List of Threatened Species.   Downloaded on 9 July 2007.
Musser, G. G. and M. D. Carleton. 2005. Superfamily Muroidea. pp. 894–1531 in Mammal Species of the World a Taxonomic and Geographic Reference. D. E. Wilson and D. M. Reeder eds. Johns Hopkins University Press, Baltimore.

Thomasomys
Mammals of Colombia
Mammals of Ecuador
Mammals described in 1912
Taxonomy articles created by Polbot